Brendonwood Historic District, also known as Brendonwood Common, is a national historic district located at Indianapolis, Indiana.  It encompasses 85 contributing buildings, 2 contributing sites, and 1 contributing object in a planned suburban residential section of Indianapolis.  350 acres on the eastern edge of Millersville with Fall Creek as the western boundary was the vision of Charles S. Lewis for a self-regulated residential zone of 110 plots.  Noted landscape architect George E. Kessler was hired to develop the planned community. The district developed between about 1917 and 1954, and includes representative examples of Tudor Revival, Colonial Revival, and Bungalow / American Craftsman style architecture. Notable contributing resources include the Common House (1924), golf course, Two Knolls (1951-1952), Farlook (1939), Springhead (1934), Dearwald (1927), Wancroft (1940), Larkwing (1952), Grasmere (1937-1938), Wetermain (1921), Whispering Trees (1952-1953), Glen Gate (1922-1923), Witching View (1928-1929), Long Ridge (1923-1924) and Great Maple (1948).

It was listed on the National Register of Historic Places in 2004.

References

External links
Brendonwood Common Board. A residential community in Indianapolis, Indiana

Historic districts on the National Register of Historic Places in Indiana
Colonial Revival architecture in Indiana
Bungalow architecture in Indiana
Tudor Revival architecture in Indiana
Historic districts in Indianapolis
National Register of Historic Places in Indianapolis